The Wollomombi Falls is a plunge waterfall on the Wollomombi River in the New England region of New South Wales, Australia.

Location and features

The Chandler Falls are on the Chandler River, adjacent to the Wollomombi Falls.

At one time they were believed to be the tallest in Australia. However, recent geographical revisions place them at second or third tallest, depending on the source, after the Tin Mine Falls in the Snowy Mountains and the Wallaman Falls, near , Queensland.

Hiking tracks and campground
Several camp grounds and walking tracks are adjacent to the Wollomombi Falls and provide access to see the waterfall. The Chandler Walk route passes Checks Lookout before reaching the Chandler Lookout and then winding down to the bottom of the gorge downstream from the falls. Checks Lookout is about a third of the way along this walk with a view back along the gorge to the falls. The Wollomombi Walk goes upstream past a lookout platform and across the Wollomombi River on a long steel bridge. The track continues to another lookout platform, which looks down on the falls from the opposite side of the gorge. A further extension of the track ends at a platform with views into the Chandler River gorge, which joins the Wollomombi Gorge.

Edgars Lookout provides an accessible view of the gorge on the western side of the falls lookouts.

Facilities include drinking water, pit toilets, shelter shed, fireplace, and bush camping sites. There is also an information display.

See also

List of waterfalls of Australia

References

External links
Northern Rivers Geology Blog - Wollomombi

Waterfalls of New South Wales
Oxley Wild Rivers National Park
New England (New South Wales)
Plunge waterfalls
Waterfalls of the Waterfall Way